Sir Frank Ree (31 October 1851 – 17 February 1914) was a British railway manager, General Manager of the London and North Western Railway and the North London Railway from 1909. Born in Walham Green, he was the son of Dr. Henry Pawle Ree. He was made a knight bachelor in 1913.

References

External links

1851 births
1914 deaths
People from Fulham
Knights Bachelor
London and North Western Railway people
North London Railway
19th-century British businesspeople